Queens Road station may refer to these stations in London:

Queens Road Peckham railway station
Queens Road (GER) railway station, a proposed station
Queensway tube station, formerly called Queen's Road
Walthamstow Queen's Road railway station
Queenstown Road railway station formerly called Queen's Road (Battersea)